Elhovo Gap (Elhovska Sedlovina \'el-hov-ska se-dlo-vi-'na\) is a 420 m high saddle extending  in west-southwest–east-northeast direction from Gleaner Heights to Leslie Hill, Livingston Island in the South Shetland Islands, Antarctica which forms part of the overland route between Bowles Ridge and Vidin Heights. The saddle is named  after the Bulgarian town of Elhovo, in association with the artificial Christmas tree ('elha' in Bulgarian) brought by the Tangra 2004/05 Survey team (Lyubomir Ivanov and Doychin Vasilev) to their bivouac at Leslie Hill occupied 24–28 December 2004, making in the process the first crossing of Elhovo Gap.

Location

Maps
 L.L. Ivanov. Antarctica: Livingston Island and Greenwich, Robert, Snow and Smith Islands. Scale 1:120000 topographic map.  Troyan: Manfred Wörner Foundation, 2009.  
 A. Kamburov and L. Ivanov. Bowles Ridge and Central Tangra Mountains: Livingston Island, Antarctica. Scale 1:25000 map. Sofia: Manfred Wörner Foundation, 2023.

References
 Elhovo Gap. SCAR Composite Antarctic Gazetteer
 Bulgarian Antarctic Gazetteer. Antarctic Place-names Commission. (details in Bulgarian, basic data in English)

External links
 Elhovo Gap. Copernix satellite image

Mountain passes of Livingston Island